La Grange is an unincorporated community in Brown County, Illinois, United States. La Grange is located on the west bank of the Illinois River, southwest of Beardstown and north of Meredosia.

References

Unincorporated communities in Brown County, Illinois
Unincorporated communities in Illinois